Division 2 was the second tier of ice hockey in Sweden for the 1943–44 season.  The league was divided into six groups, and the winner of each group was promoted to Division 1 for the 1944–45 season.  This change from previous seasons—in which the group winners had played a qualifier which resulted in only two teams being promoted—was prompted from the change in format from the eight-team Svenska Serien to a twelve-team Division 1 following the 1943–44 season.  Sandvikens IF, IF Göta, Surahammars IF, IFK Mariefred, Tranebergs IF, and Skuru IK won their groups, and were therefore promoted into the new Division 1.

The 1943 Swedish Ice Hockey Championship was held as a separate tournament, and included teams from Division 2.

Final group standings

Norra ("north")

Västra ("west")

Centrala ("central")

Mälargruppen

Östra ("east")

Södra ("south")

See also
 Division 2 (Swedish ice hockey)
 1943–44 Svenska Serien season
 1944 Swedish Ice Hockey Championship

External links
 Division 2 norra 1943/44 on Svenskhockey.com
 Division 2 västra 1943/44 on Svenskhockey.com
 Division 2 centrala 1943/44 on Svenskhockey.com
 Division 2 mälargruppen 1943/44 on Svenskhockey.com
 Division 2 östra 1943/44 on Svenskhockey.com
 Division 2 södra 1943/44 on Svenskhockey.com

Division 2 (Swedish ice hockey) seasons
2